Electoral history of Bob Barr, Republican Representative from Georgia (1995–2003) and Libertarian Party presidential nominee in 2008 election.

Senate and House races (1992–2002) 
Republican primary for the United States Senate from Georgia, 1992:
 Paul Coverdell – 100,016 (37.1%)
 Bob Barr – 65,471 (24.3%)
 John Knox – 64,514 (23.9%)
 Charlie Tanksley – 32,590 (12.1%)
 Dean Parkinson – 7,352 (2.7%)

Republican primary runoff for the United States Senate from Georgia, 1992:
 Paul Coverdell – 80,435 (50.5%)
 Bob Barr – 78,887 (49.5%)

Georgia's 7th congressional district, 1994 (Republican primary):
 Bob Barr – 16,165 (57.0%)
 Brenda Fitzgerald – 12,217 (43.1%)

Georgia's 7th congressional district, 1994:
 Bob Barr (R) – 71,265 (51.9%)
 Buddy Darden (D) (inc.) – 65,978 (48.1%)

Georgia's 7th congressional district, 1996:
 Bob Barr (R) (inc.) – 112,009 (57.8%)
 Charlie Watts (D) – 81,765 (42.2%)

Georgia's 7th congressional district, 1998:
 Bob Barr (R) (inc.) – 85,982 (55.4%)
 James F. Williams (D) – 69,293 (44.6%)

Georgia's 7th congressional district, 2000:
 Bob Barr (R) (inc.) – 126,312 (55.3%)
 Roger Kahn (D) – 102,272 (44.7%)

Georgia's 7th congressional district, 2002 (Republican primary):
 John Linder (inc.) – 56,893 (64.5%)
 Bob Barr (inc.) – 31,377 (35.6%)

Note: Linder, incumbent from 11th district, ran against 7th district incumbent Barr due to districts borders changes

United States presidential election, 2008 
2008 Libertarian National Convention:

First ballot:
 Bob Barr – 153
 Mary Ruwart – 152
 Wayne Allyn Root – 123
 Mike Gravel – 71
 George Phillies – 49
 Steve Kubby – 41
 Michael Jingozian – 23
 Ron Paul – 6
 Christine Smith – 6
 Penn Jillette – 3
 Daniel Imperato – 1
 William Koehler – 1
 None of the above – 2

Second ballot:
 Bob Barr – 188
 Mary Ruwart – 162
 Wayne Allyn Root – 138
 Mike Gravel – 71
 George Phillies – 38
 Steve Kubby – 32
 Ron Paul – 3
 Stephen Colbert – 1
 Jesse Ventura – 1
 None of the above – 1

Third ballot:
 Bob Barr – 186
 Mary Ruwart – 186
 Wayne Allyn Root – 146
 Mike Gravel – 71
 George Phillies – 31
 Ron Paul – 1
 None of the above – 2

Fourth ballot:
 Bob Barr – 202
 Mary Ruwart – 202
 Wayne Allyn Root – 149
 Mike Gravel – 76
 None of the above – 2

Fifth ballot:
 Mary Ruwart – 229
 Bob Barr – 223
 Wayne Allyn Root – 165
 None of the above – 6

Sixth ballot:
 Bob Barr – 324
 Mary Ruwart – 276
 Ralph Nader – 1
 Ron Paul – 1
 None of the above – 26

2008 Libertarian ticket:
 Former Representative Bob Barr of Georgia for President
 Wayne Allyn Root of New York for Vice President

See also
 Bob Barr presidential campaign, 2008
 Political positions of Bob Barr
 Electoral history of Barack Obama (Democratic nominee)
 Electoral history of John McCain (Republican nominee)
 Electoral history of Cynthia McKinney (Green nominee)
 Electoral history of Ralph Nader (Independent candidate)

References

Barr, Bob
History of libertarianism